Alo Libang (born 1 March 1964)  is an Indian politician from the state of Arunachal Pradesh. He is the current Minister for Health and Family Welfare, Women and Child Development & Tribal Affairs of Arunachal Pradesh.

Alo Libang was elected uncontested as a candidate from 34 Tuting-Yingkiong constituency seat in the 2014 Arunachal Pradesh Legislative Assembly election, as an Indian National Congress (INC) candidate and in 2019 Assembly election by securing 5800 votes he was again elected as Member of Legislative Assembly of Arunachal Pradesh from the same Constituency by defeating Janata Dal (Secular) candidate Gegong Apang by a margin of 1609 votes.

Early life and education 
Alo Libang was born and brought up in a small village called Simong, 10 kilometres away from Yingkiong Town, Upper Siang, Arunachal Pradesh. He was well versed in public speaking from his childhood. He completed his graduation in Bachelor of Arts (B.A.) from Jawaharlal Nehru College, Pasighat under Rajiv Gandhi University erstwhile Arunachal University in Itanagar, Arunachal Pradesh.

Political career 
He made his foray into politics during the year 2009 and was elected as Member of Legislative Assembly of Arunachal Pradesh, as a candidate from Nationalist Congress Party (NCP). He later joined Indian National Congress Party in 2012. He holds many important portfolios in Arunachal cabinet. He is currently serving as Minister, Health & Family Welfare, Social Welfare, Women & Child Development, Social Justice, Empowerment & Tribal Affairs. In September 2016, he was sworn in as the Deputy Speaker of Arunachal Pradesh Legislative Assembly and in Assembly election of 2019 he won seat from 34 Tuting-Yingkiong (ST) constituency as Member of Legislative Assembly of Arunachal Pradesh as a Bharatiya Janata Party (BJP) candidate.

Public policies and schemes 
He launched the HRMIS (Human Resources Management Information System) state level flagship programme under the National Health Mission (NHM) to ensure timely and transparent dispensation of Health services across all districts as first of its kind in the State and launched Mission 'Pratiraksha" to ensure 100 percent immunisation coverage of children in the State to curb the spread of preventable diseases. The programme achieved 67 percent immunisation and he introduced ' Sarkaar Apke Dwaar' (Government at your Doorstep) initiative in remote areas of Tuting, Upper Siang making accessible basic government services to local population which are some of his major contributions in the field of public services. In April 2020, he inaugurated first COVID-19 Testing Lab at Tomo Riba Institute of Health and Medical Science (TRIHMS) Itanagar, which is the first ever Covid-19 Testing Facility in the State and third in Northeast India after Assam and Mizoram. The Health Minister was reported Covid-19 positive along with six other Legislators from the State of Arunachal Pradesh in mid September 2020.

2019 assembly elections 
Alo Libang contested election for 2019 and won seat in the Arunachal Legislative Assembly as a Bharatiya Janata Party candidate from 34 Tuting-Yingkiong constituency as the 'Chowkidar'  (watchman) campaign slogan is adopted and espoused by current Prime Minister of India Narendra Modi, now a catchphrase in vogue, later many including Libang also adopted an expression "Main bhi Chowkidaar" (roughly translating to "me too watchman") to express solidarity with the party vision of BJP. He secured a total of 5800 votes and defeated the Janta Dal (Secular) candidate Gegong Apang and Tsepa Wanchuk Khampa by a margin of 1609 and 5472 votes respectively for the 34 Tuing-Yingkiong Constituency in 2019 Assembly election.

See also
 Arunachal Pradesh Legislative Assembly
 Gegong Apang

References

External links
Alo Libang Janta Pratinidhi profile 
MyNeta Profile
Profile

People's Party of Arunachal politicians
Indian National Congress politicians
Living people
Bharatiya Janata Party politicians from Arunachal Pradesh
Arunachal Pradesh MLAs 2014–2019
State cabinet ministers of Arunachal Pradesh
1964 births
People from Upper Siang district
Deputy Speakers of the Arunachal Pradesh Legislative Assembly
Nationalist Congress Party politicians
Arunachal Pradesh MLAs 2009–2014
Arunachal Pradesh MLAs 2019–2024